Love Supreme Collective is a 2014 extended play by jazz musician Frank Catalano, released on July 29, 2014. The recording features Jimmy Chamberlin from the Smashing Pumpkins, Percy Jones from Brand X, Chris Poland from Megadeth, and Adam Benjamin from Kneebody. Upon release, it became the #1 selling jazz album on iTunes USA.

Track listing
"Acknowledgement of Truth" (7:44)
"Resolution of Purpose" (3:19)
"Pursuance and Persistence" (6:12)
"Psalm For John" (4:43)

Personnel
Frank Catalano - saxophone
Jimmy Chamberlin - drums and percussion
Percy Jones - bass guitar
Chris Poland - guitar
Adam Benjamin - keyboards

References

2014 EPs
Jazz EPs